Tasha Page House (born March 21, 1983 as Natasha Marie Page) is an American Christian R&B and urban contemporary gospel artist and musician. She won the gospel singing competition, Sunday Best, in season six of BET. She started her music career in 2014 with the release of Here Right Now by RCA Records and Fo Yo Soul Recordings. Her first studio album, Here Right Now, charted on the Billboard charts The Billboard 200 and Top Gospel Albums.

Early life
Page-Lockhart was born on March 21, 1983, in Detroit, Michigan as Natasha Marie Page, whose parents are musicians and pastors themselves. Her stepfather is Bishop Michael Alan Brooks of Commissioned and her mother is Pastor Lisa Charise Page Brooks of Witness and of Restoration Fellowship Church International in Detroit. She has two sisters who are younger than she. They are Latia "Tia" Charise Page and Sateara Renee Page, and she also has a brother, Justin. In her childhood, she was molested various times by some family members and trusted family friends. While she was in high school, she played basketball, and had dreams of aspiring to be a WNBA player. Yet, those dreams would soon change, when at 17 years old, she got pregnant, and had a child at 18, causing her to become a high school dropout. This caused her life to spiral out of control, and she got addicted to drugs, causing her childhood boyfriend Clifton to depart for Atlanta, Georgia, in 2006. She got her life under control by eventually relocating to Atlanta, and getting involved in music ministry.

Music career
Her music career started by becoming a part of her mother's women's gospel group, Witness. The solo career started in 2013 with the Sunday Best reality gospel singing competition on BET. She won the show in season six, which granted her a recording contract with RCA Records label, Fo Yo Soul Recordings, which Kirk Franklin is the operator. This allowed her to introduce her first solo studio album, Here Right Now, on August 5, 2014. The album charted on the Billboard charts at No. 87 on The Billboard 200 and at the third position of the Top Gospel Albums chart. This was awarded a three and a half star out of five review from Andy Kellman of AllMusic, while Dwayne Lacy of New Release Tuesday granted the album a four and a half star review out of five. She was nominated for three awards at the 30th Stellar Awards in 2015 winning New Artist of the Year. In 2019 at the 34th Stellar awards she won Contemporary Female vocalist of the year. She won female vocalist of the year at the 2019 Steeple awards. Previously she won female vocalist of the year in the UK for the Gospel Touch Music awards.

Personal life
She married Clifton James "Cliff" Lockhart in July 2006, after relocating to Atlanta. In 2008, they moved back to Detroit, Michigan so she could give birth to their first child among family and friends, but her second child after having Ronald Hughes eight years earlier in 2001. She gave birth to Clifton James Lockhart, II, in 2008.

She and Clifton Lockhart separated in 2017 and divorced in 2018. She began posting pictures of herself with T. Vernon House to her Instagram page, thanking him for "sweeping her off her feet". They married June 8, 2019 in Detroit, Michigan. The ceremony, "House of Love", was officiated by her godfather, King Drolo Bosso Adamtey 1. Many R&B and gospel artists attended.

Discography

Studio albums

Singles

As featured artist

Non Singles

Filmography

References

External links
Official website
Fo Yo Soul Recordings profile

1983 births
Living people
African-American male songwriters
African-American Christians
Musicians from Atlanta
Songwriters from Georgia (U.S. state)
Songwriters from Michigan
RCA Records artists
Singers from Detroit
American gospel singers
21st-century African-American male singers